Clifford Paul Bartosh (born September 5, 1979) is a former left-handed relief pitcher in Major League Baseball who played for the Cleveland Indians and Chicago Cubs.

He was selected in the 29th round of the 1998 Major League Baseball Draft by the San Diego Padres. He made his MLB debut on May 15, 2004, and was with the Indians in four different stints over the year. He improved as the year went on, posting an ERA of 2.70 in his last 30 appearances. His role in the bullpen often was to come in against a lefty, sometimes for just one out. For the Indians in 2004, he went 1–0 in 34 appearances in relief, posting a 4.66 ERA. In 2005, he went 0–2 with an ERA of 5.49 in 19 relief appearances.

A 2005 single in his only at-bat left Bartosh with a rare MLB career batting average of 1.000.

External links

1979 births
Living people
Cleveland Indians players
Chicago Cubs players
Major League Baseball pitchers
Baseball players from Texas
People from Duncanville, Texas
Fort Wayne Wizards players
Lake Elsinore Storm players
Mobile BayBears players
Portland Beavers players
Buffalo Bisons (minor league) players
Iowa Cubs players
People from West, Texas
American people of Czech descent
Duncanville High School alumni